Championnet Sports  is a French basketball club based in Paris. This is one of many sections of the sports club Championnet Sports whose socio-educational and cultural activities as well as the very important real estate is managed by a third association, the Association Championnet.

The club is best known for its good performance in the championship of France basketball from 1940, counting among its members several prominent players.

History 
In 1891 Championnet founded in the parish "St. Genevieve Great Careers." Various activities are pushing to declare in 1907 a multi-sports association affiliated to the Sports Championnet FGSPF. It was not until 1914 to identify the first game of basketball. Then the section is gradually developing into Champion of France in 1945 and provide three players to the team of France in 1948 during the London Olympic Games.

The club then participates in first five France championship seasons of basketball (1950–1954) and descends the 1954–55 season in Division Excellence. It goes back to a season in National Division in 1955–56 and reappears there one last time in 1961–62. The association then refusing to follow the evolution of basketball to the professionalism and the basketball section falls into anonymity. The Championnet Sports Association remains, although they practice other activities in a sporting or recreational purposes, but also for social inclusion.

Honours 

French League
 Winners (1): 1944–45
French League 2
 Winners (2): 1936–37, 1948–49

Notable players 
  Henri Lesmayoux
  Maurice Desaymonet
  Maurice Girardot
  André Barrais
  Pierre Savetier

Head coaches 
  Henri Lesmayoux (1949–53 & 1955–62)
  Maurice Girardot (1953–54)

External links 
 Official site

Basketball teams in Paris
Basketball teams established in 1914
Sports clubs established in 1891
1891 establishments in France